The 2009 Open de Suède Vårgårda – team time trial was the second team time trial running on the Open de Suède Vårgårda.

General standings (top 10)

Results from uci.ch.

References

External links
 Official website 

2009 in women's road cycling
2009 in Swedish sport
2009 UCI Women's Road World Cup
Open de Suède Vårgårda